The 1980 United States Senate election in Alabama took place on November 4, 1980, alongside other elections to the United States Senate in other states as well as elections to the United States House of Representatives and various state and local elections. Incumbent Democratic U.S. Senator Donald Stewart, elected in a special election to finish the term of the seat left vacant by the death of Senator James B. Allen, decided to run for a full term, but was defeated in the primary by Jim Folsom. In November, Folsom narrowly lost the general election to Republican Jeremiah Denton.

Denton was the first Republican elected to the Senate from Alabama since the end of Reconstruction and the first Republican elected since the passage of the 17th amendment requiring the direct election of senators. He would lose reelection in the 1986 election to Democratic nominee Richard Shelby who later joined the Republican Party in 1994.

Candidates

Democratic
 Jim Folsom, Public Service Commissioner
 Donald Stewart, incumbent U.S. Senator

Republican
 Jeremiah Denton, U.S. Navy veteran
 Armistead I. Selden Jr., former Democratic Representative and Ambassador

Results

See also 
 1980 United States Senate elections
 Reagan's coattails

References 

1980 Alabama elections
Alabama
1980